Fantasy couture, also sometimes called couture fantasy, is a type of haute couture.  It represents a trend in fashion and design that emphasize fantastical appearance over practicality/functionality and has elements drawn from the fantasy genre of literature and of film, often presented in an extreme style of detail, complexity, and precision. The trend is characterized by individuals such as Iris van Herpen, Eiko Ishioka, Guo Pei, Tim Yip, Alexander McQueen, Tex Saverio, Stephen Jones, Mary Sibande, and Bobby Love, among many others.

An example of this style is performed annually at the Labyrinth of Jareth Masquerade Ball held in Hollywood, California, named for the 1986 film Labyrinth.

References

Haute couture